Luis Alberto Vidal Gajardo (born 22 May 1952) is a Chilean former footballer who played as a centre-back for clubs in Chile and Ecuador.

Club career
A defender from Municipal Santiago youth system, Vidal played for several clubs in the Chilean football. In the top division, he made appearances for Audax Italiano (1971), Unión San Felipe (1973–74), Santiago Morning (1975), and Naval (1979).

In the second level, he played fpr San Antonio Unido (1972), Santiago Wanderers (1981) San Luis de Quillota (1983), Deportes Puerto Montt (1984, 1986), among others.  

Abroad, he played for 9 de Octubre in the Ecuadorian Serie A in 1982.

Personal life
Vidal has worked as a caretaker for Colegio Marista (Marista School) from Curicó.

References

1952 births
Living people
Footballers from Santiago
Chilean footballers
Chilean expatriate footballers
Chile under-20 international footballers
Primera B de Chile players
Chilean Primera División players
Audax Italiano footballers
San Antonio Unido footballers
Unión San Felipe footballers
Santiago Morning footballers
Malleco Unido footballers
Naval de Talcahuano footballers
Curicó Unido footballers
Santiago Wanderers footballers
San Luis de Quillota footballers
Puerto Montt footballers
Deportes Valdivia footballers
Ecuadorian Serie A players
Chilean expatriate sportspeople in Ecuador
Expatriate footballers in Ecuador
Association football defenders